Michael Allen Bantom (born December 3, 1951) is an American former professional basketball player.

A 6'9" power forward/center from Saint Joseph's University, Bantom won a silver medal at the 1972 Summer Olympics as a member of the United States national basketball team, who lost a controversial final game to the Soviet Union.  He was selected by the Phoenix Suns with the eighth pick of the 1973 NBA draft, and he embarked upon a nine-year NBA (1973–82) career as a member of the Suns, Seattle SuperSonics, New York Nets, Indiana Pacers, and Philadelphia 76ers.  He earned All-Rookie Team honors and ended his NBA career with 8,568 total points, 4,517 total rebounds, and 1,623 total assists.  From 1982 until 1989, Bantom played professionally in Italy.

Since retiring as a player, Bantom has served as the licensing manager for NBA International, the NBA International director of marketing, the NBA senior vice president of player development, and the executive vice president of referee operations.

Bantom is a father of four children, three daughters and a son.

References

External links
 NBA.com profile
 
 Bantom's Italian League Statistics

1951 births
Living people
All-American college men's basketball players
American expatriate basketball people in Italy
American men's basketball players
Auxilium Pallacanestro Torino players
Basketball players at the 1972 Summer Olympics
Basketball players from Philadelphia
Indiana Pacers players
Medalists at the 1972 Summer Olympics
Mens Sana Basket players
National Basketball Association league office executives
New York Nets players
Olympic silver medalists for the United States in basketball
Pallacanestro Virtus Roma players
Philadelphia 76ers players
Phoenix Suns draft picks
Phoenix Suns players
Power forwards (basketball)
Saint Joseph's Hawks men's basketball players
Seattle SuperSonics players
United States men's national basketball team players